UNA is a downtempo electronica group formed in 2006.

Music style
Using mostly downtempo jazz inspired grooves and Wurli electric piano, UNA proceeds to deliver profound pop with turntabalism, lending their vibe to what is called electronica but would otherwise be described as a new form arising from the aftermath of giants Portishead and Massive Attack. While not re-hashing those ideas yet remaining openly positive and spirited, UNA is moving into new territory with musical references to 50's sci-fi, exotica, soundtracks, and classical music

History
Downtempo Electronic quartet UNA formed in 2006 around the edges of another LA trio "Elephonic", sharing members Jennifer Nice and Eddie Barajas. Producer Richard Larsen recorded a demo for Jennifer, and, after hearing her Latin soul vibe, started working on the EP The Rain is Over and Gone in late 2006. Soon Eddie B joined them and a full-length release, entitled "one", followed shortly in mid-2007. Several songs were favored by influential radio station KCRW (home of Morning Becomes Eclectic with Nic Harcourt) and swept the LP to the top position, debuting at #1 in the US for unsigned bands in late 2007.

Naming
The name comes from a number of inspirations. Looking at a map of Brazil the band members noticed there was a tiny village on the tip of the country where it sticks out into the Atlantic Ocean, the town of Una. The Fifth Element is yet another inspiration. Diva Plavalaguna is the main performer in an opera as the holder of the stones. Finally it was curious no one had taken the name, this band was the first UNA, and the word itself in Spanish is only used to infer the singular feminine aspect, to such as water, freedom, earth, house, door, light, moon, cloud, hand, picture, chair, and music. The first LP the band put out was called "one" and proved the point by debuting at #1.

Band members
Richard Larsen, co-producer/writer/keyboardist/guitarist
Jennifer Nice, vocalist/keys/writer/co-producer
Eddie Barajas, turntables

Discography

Studio albums
 The Rain is Over and Gone - September, 2006
 one - July, 2007
 We Are the Lonely - August, 2010
 The Laughing Man EP - March, 2013
 The Laughing Man Remix LP - 2013
 Hiss for the Fly - 2016
 Noise of the Wing - 2018

References

External links

 SoundCloud review
 A MILLION WATTS OF SOUND review
 Hiss for the Fly: A Common Apocalyptic Survival Guide  on BigShot Magazine

Electronica music groups